Similosodus verticalis is a species of beetle in the family Cerambycidae. It was described by Francis Polkinghorne Pascoe in 1865, originally under the genus Sodus. It is known from Malaysia, Java, and Singapore.

References

verticalis
Beetles described in 1865